Makhtumkala or Magtymgala is a riverside village in Turkmenistan.

Site 
At the western perimeter of the village is the Mausoleum of Makhtum — a rectangular structure (c. 14th-15th century) with a tin-domed roof and an entrance, flanked with niches. It remains inaccessible to tourists.

About 14 km east of the village, a trek leads to the Kozhdemir (var. Gochedmir) Waterfalls.

Wildlife 
Snow leopards were spotted in 1970. Common noctules are seen.

References

External links 

 Trek to the waterfalls and pictures

Populated places in Turkmenistan